Dwaram Mallikarjun Reddy is a member of the 13th Maharashtra Legislative Assembly. He represents the Ramtek Assembly Constituency. He belongs to the Bharatiya Janata Party He is a former state government contractor. In September, 2014, he resigned from his firm, before filing his nominations as government contractors are debarred from contesting elections. In 2009, Reddy had unsuccessfully contested elections to the same seat representing the Gondwana Gantantra Party.

On 5 January 2016, Reddy and some of his supporters were arrested for ransacking a car at the Maharashtra Tourism Development Corporation's Rajkamal resort and bar.

References

Maharashtra MLAs 2014–2019
People from Nagpur district
Bharatiya Janata Party politicians from Maharashtra
Living people
Year of birth missing (living people)